For United Ukraine! was a political alliance and an electoral bloc in Ukraine founded in December 2001 to participate in the parliamentary election held on 30 March 2002.

History
In the parliamentary election, the party was supportive of authoritarian, incumbent President Leonid Kuchma, and opposed to the pro-democratic Our Ukraine–People's Self-Defense Bloc. It was described by Radio Free Europe/Radio Liberty as a "party of power", including oligarchs, bureaucrats, and pro-Kuchma politicians, as an attempt to further increase Kuchma's power through constitutional and extra-constitutional means. At the election, the alliance won 11.77% of the popular vote and a total of 102 out of 450 seats, placing it in third behind Our Ukraine and the Communist Party of Ukraine. Final poll results had predicted 7-8% of the total votes. The alliance received many of its votes from Donetsk Oblast.

The alliance consisted of the 5 following members:
 Party of Regions, led by Volodymyr Semynozhenko.
 Agrarian Party of Ukraine, led by Governor of Lviv Oblast Mykhailo Hladiy.
 Party of Industrialists and Entrepreneurs of Ukraine (PPPU), led by Anatoliy Kinakh.
 People's Democratic Party, led by former Prime Minister Valeriy Pustovoitenko.
 Labour Ukraine, led by Serhiy Tyhypko.

Top-10 party list: Volodymyr Lytvyn (non-partisan), Anatoliy Kinakh (Party of Industrialists and Entrepreneurs of Ukraine), Kateryna Vashchuk (Agrarian Party of Ukraine), Volodymyr Boiko (Party of Regions), Viktor Skopenko (Party of Industrialists and Entrepreneurs of Ukraine), Valeriy Pustovoitenko (People's Democratic Party), Serhiy Tihipko (Labour Ukraine), Volodymyr Semynozhenko (Party of Regions), Mykhailo Hladiy (Agrarian Party of Ukraine), Heorhiy Kirpa  (non-partisan).

Since the election
The electoral bloc disintegrated in June 2002, following the 2002 Ukrainian parliamentary election.

See also
 United Russia, pro-Putin political project created in 2001
 Our Ukraine–People's Self-Defense Bloc, main opponent

References

External links
 
 
 

Defunct political party alliances in Ukraine
Parliamentary factions in Ukraine
2001 establishments in Ukraine
2006 disestablishments in Ukraine
Russian political parties in Ukraine
Leonid Kuchma
Party of Regions